Carex sclerocarpa is a tussock-forming species of perennial sedge in the family Cyperaceae. It is native to Taiwan and south central and south eastern parts of China.

See also
List of Carex species

References

sclerocarpa
Taxa named by Adrien René Franchet
Plants described in 1895
Flora of China
Flora of Taiwan